Acen Rhoda is a Ugandan politician. She was the Forum for Democratic Change representative in the eighth Parliament of Uganda under Amuria District. Rhoda was named after a primary school located in Amusus, Kuju, County, Amuria District called Rhoda Acen Primary School.

Political career 
During her political office, Acen said that women in Katakwi in the  Eastern Uganda have been selling their children each at for 3,000 Uganda Shillings to fend for their families after their husbands fled ahead of the disarmament exercise in the region. This was mentioned by Rhoda while addressing the women Member of  Parliament during a  workshop organised by  the Uganda Women's Network and funded by the Westminster Foundation for Democracy. The workshop was on women's rights under multiparty democracy held at Entebbe Imperial Resort Beach Hotel. In 2020, Rhoda bounced back after beating Susan Amero, the incumbent Member of Parliament. In 2007, she was among the Teso Parliamentary Group who addressed a press conference at Parliament where they displayed some of the rotten samples of the beans supplied by the Government as relief to their people.

See also 

 List of members of the eighth Parliament of Uganda

References 

Living people
People from Amuria District
Ugandan politicians by party
Members of the Parliament of Uganda
Women members of the Parliament of Uganda
Forum for Democratic Change politicians
Year of birth missing (living people)